Kyrkjetaket or Kirketaket is a mountain on the border of the municipalities of Rauma and Nesset in Møre og Romsdal county, Norway. The name Kyrkjetaket translates to "the Church roof".

In February 2004, it was chosen as one of Norway's 10 finest alpine mountains by the magazine Fri Flyt.

See also
List of mountains of Norway

References

Mountains of Møre og Romsdal
Rauma, Norway